Parinya Pankaew (born ) is a Thai female volleyball player. She was part of the Thailand women's national volleyball team. On club level she played for Supreme Chonburi in 2013.

Awards

Clubs
 2013 Thai-Denmark Super League -  Runner-Up, with Supreme Nakhonsi VC
 2016 PSL Invitational Cup -  Co-champion, with Est Cola
 2016–17 Thailand League -  Champion, with Supreme Chonburi
 2017 Thai-Denmark Super League -  Champion, with Supreme Chonburi
 2017–18 Thailand League -  Champion, with Supreme Chonburi
 2018 Thai-Denmark Super League -  Champion, with Supreme Chonburi
 2018–19 Thailand League -  Runner-Up, with Supreme Chonburi

National team
 2014 Asian Games -  Bronze medal

References

External links
 FIVB profile

1995 births
Living people
Parinya Pankaew
Parinya Pankaew
Place of birth missing (living people)
Asian Games medalists in volleyball
Volleyball players at the 2014 Asian Games
Parinya Pankaew
Medalists at the 2014 Asian Games
Parinya Pankaew
Parinya Pankaew